The West Indies women's cricket team toured India in January 2011. They played against India in five One Day Internationals and three Twenty20 Internationals, losing the ODI series 3–2 and losing the T20I series 2–1.

Squads

Tour Match: Indian Board President's XI v West Indies

WODI Series

1st ODI

2nd ODI

3rd ODI

4th ODI

5th ODI

WT20I Series

1st T20I

2nd T20I

3rd T20I

References

External links
West Indies Women tour of India 2010/11 from Cricinfo

International cricket competitions in 2011
2011 in women's cricket
Women's international cricket tours of India
West Indies women's cricket team tours